Tactically Exploited Reconnaissance Node (TERN), a joint program between DARPA and the U.S. Navy's Office of Naval Research (ONR), seeks to greatly increase the effectiveness of forward-deployed small-deck ships such as destroyers and frigates by enabling them to serve as mobile launch and recovery sites for specially designed unmanned aerial systems (UAS). These vehicles are to carry  of ordnance in order to conduct combat strikes.

History
Northrop Grumman won the contract to develop the project in December 2015 with tail-sitter, flying wing aircraft with a twin nose-mounted contra-rotating propeller propulsion system.

References

DARPA projects
Tern
Tailsitter aircraft
Flying wings
Unmanned military aircraft of the United States
VTOL aircraft